Ankarcrona is a Swedish noble family originating from Christoffer Jakobsson, a German Protestant convert who immigrated to Sweden from Bohemia in the 17th century, and resided in Ronneby in Sweden. Two of his grandsons were ennobled, but these branches ceased in 1719 and 1750.

The now living branch stems from his third grandson, the assessor Jakob Christoffer in Karlskrona. He was ennobled in 1751.

Members in selection

Theodor Ankarcrona (1687–1750), Admiral, scientist
Jakob Christoffer Ankarkrona, ennobled in 1751.
Theodor Vilhelm Ankarcrona, father to Edvard Alexander and Henrik August
Edvard Alexander (Alexis) Ankarcrona (1825–1901) artist and military officer, brother of Henrik August
Henrik August Ankarcrona (1831–1917), military officer and painter.
Sten Johan Theodor Claes Ankarcrona (1861–1936) marine officer
Gustaf Ankarcrona (1869–1933), artist and scientist
Sten Sture Gustaf Ankarcrona, colonel

References 

Swedish noble families